Piscivoravis is an extinct genus of fish-eating ornithuromorphs known from the Early Cretaceous Jiufotang Formation (Aptian age) of western Liaoning Province, northeastern China. Piscivoravis was first named by Shuang Zhou, Zhonghe Zhou and Jingmai O'Connor in 2013 and the type species is Piscivoravis lii. Phylogenetic analysis places Piscivoravis in a more derived position than Archaeorhynchus, in a polytomy with Jianchangornis, Patagopteryx, and the clade including all more derived ornithuromorphs.

References

Bird genera
Early Cretaceous birds of Asia
Fossil taxa described in 2013
Paleontology in Liaoning
Songlingornithids